Outdoor literature is a literature genre about or involving the outdoors. Outdoor literature encompasses several different subgenres including exploration literature, adventure literature, mountain literature and nature writing. Another subgenre is the guide book, an early example of which was Thomas West's guide to the Lake District published in 1778. The genres can include activities such as exploration, survival, sailing, hiking, mountaineering, whitewater boating, geocaching or kayaking, or writing about nature and the environment. Travel literature is similar to outdoor literature but differs in that it does not always deal with the out-of-doors, but there is a considerable overlap between these genres, in particular with regard to long journeys.

History
Henry David Thoreau's Walden (1854) is an early and influential work. Although not entirely an outdoor work (he lived in a cabin close to civilization) he expressed the ideas of why people go out into the wilderness to camp, backpack and hike: to get away from the rush of modern society and simplify life. This was a new perspective for the time and thus Walden has had a lasting influence on most outdoor authors.

Robert Louis Stevenson's Travels with a Donkey in the Cévennes (1879), about his travels in Cévennes (France), is among the first popular books to present hiking and camping as recreational activities, and tells of commissioning one of the first sleeping bags.

In the world of sailing Joshua Slocum's Sailing Alone Around the World (1900) is a classic of outdoor literature. In April 1895, Joshua Slocum set sail from Boston, Massachusetts and in  Sailing Alone Around the World, he described his departure:

More than three years later, on June 27, 1898, he returned to Newport, Rhode Island, having circumnavigated the world, a distance of more than 46,000 miles (74,000 km).

The National Outdoor Book Award was established in 1997 as a US-based non-profit program which each year honours the best in outdoor writing and publishing.

Outdoor classics 

 19th century

 John MacGregor (1866).  A Thousand Miles in a Rob Roy Canoe. Considered the first documentation of recreational canoeing.

 Edward Whymper (1871). Scrambles Amongst the Alps in the Years 1860–1869.
 Mark Twain (1872). Roughing It. Part real part fiction, classic account of life in the American Old West.
 Walter Weston (1896). Mountaineering and Exploration in the Japanese Alps.
 20th century
 John Muir, (1911). My First Summer in the Sierra.

 Grey Owl (1935). Pilgrims of the Wild.  About Grey Owl's life in the wilds of Canada.
 Gontran de Poncins (1939). Kabloona. French adventurer living with Eskimos in the late 1930s.

 Maurice Herzog (1951). Annapurna: Conquest of the First 8000-metre Peak. Probably the most influential mountaineering expedition book.
 Wallace Stegner (1954). Beyond the Hundredth Meridian: John Wesley Powell and the Second Opening of the West.

 Alfred Lansing (1959). Endurance: Shackleton's Incredible Voyage.
 John Hillaby, Journey to the Jade Sea (1964); Journey through Britain; Journey through Europe; Journey to the Gods (1991). Accounts of various long distance walks.
 Edward Abbey (1968) Desert Solitaire
 Colin Fletcher (1968) The Complete Walker
 Annie Dillard, (1974) Pilgrim at Tinker Creek
 Patrick Leigh Fermor, A Time of Gifts (1977); Between the Woods and the Water (1986); The Broken Road (2013). A trilogy describing a walk across Europe.
 Nan Shepherd, (1977). The Living Mountain.
 Jon Krakauer (1990s). Into the Wild, Into Thin Air.
 Joe Simpson, Touching the Void (1988). Mountain climbing in the Andes.
 21st century
 Jim Perrin, Spirits of Place (1997); The Climbing Essays (2006); West: A Journey through the Landscapes of Loss (2010).  A rock climber and travel writer.
 Bill McKibben (2005) Wandering Home. Also: The End of Nature (1989)
 Rory Stewart, The Places in Between (2006). A walk across Afghanistan in 2002, after the Russians had left.
 Cheryl Strayed, Wild: From Lost to Found on the Pacific Crest Trail (2013). Describes the grueling life of the long-distance hiker, the perils of the PCT, and its peculiar community of wanderers.
 Robert Macfarlane, Mountains of the Mind: A History of a Fascination; The Wild Places; The Old Ways: A Journey on Foot (2012). He is one of a number of recent British writers who have provoked a new critical and popular interest in writing about landscape.

See also

 
 
 
 
 Banff Mountain Book Festival

References

External links
 National Outdoor Book Awards
 American Journeys, collection of primary exploration accounts of the Americas.

 
Literature
Non-fiction genres
Non-fiction outdoors writers
Outdoor literature